List of mayors of Hillsboro, Oregon, United States, arranged chronologically by term.

Mayors

See also
 List of mayors of places in Oregon

References

Hillsboro